Oppam Oppathinoppam is a 1986 Indian Malayalam-language film, directed by Soman and produced by K. H. Khan Sahib. The film stars Mohanlal, Shankar, Menaka and Lalu Alex. The film has musical score by Jerry Amaldev.

Cast
Mohanlal as Krishnankutty
Shankar as Gopinath
Menaka as Rajamma
Lalu Alex as Mathachan
Madhuri as Devaki
Mala Aravindan as Neelandan
Meena
Baby Rekha
Sankaradi as Paramu Nair
Adoor Bhavani as Karthyayani

Soundtrack
The music was composed by Jerry Amaldev with lyrics by Bichu Thirumala.

References

External links
 

1986 films
1980s Malayalam-language films
Films scored by Jerry Amaldev